Mishima Dam is an earthfill dam located in Chiba Prefecture in Japan. The dam is used for irrigation. The catchment area of the dam is 26.1 km2. The dam impounds about 72  ha of land when full and can store 5400 thousand cubic meters of water. The construction of the dam was completed in 1955.

References

Dams in Chiba Prefecture
1955 establishments in Japan